The BICh-11 (a.k.a. RP-1) (Raketnyii Planer – rocket glider)  was a twin-engined tailless research aircraft designed and built in the USSR from 1931.

Development 
The BICh-11 was the first purpose-designed rocket-powered aircraft in the world. It was planned to power the BICh-11 with two Tsander OR-2 liquid fuelled rocket engines; however it was never flown with the rocket engines as they had not been proven safe for use in manned aircraft. Flight testing began early in 1932 as a bungee-launched glider with ski undercarriage. Later flight tests used an ABC Scorpion piston engine.

The 50 kg (110 lb) thrust Tsander OR-2 engines were to have been mounted either side of the central nacelle in small over-wing fairings, with large liquid-oxygen and gasoline tanks mounted forward of the engines' combustion chambers. The rocket engines were successfully bench run in 1933, but were never installed in the aircraft.

Variants
BICh-11 – Twin rocket powered tail-less aircraft
RP-1 – Alternate designation for BICh-11

Specifications (BICh-11 with ABC Scorpion)

See also

References

Gunston, Bill. “The Osprey Encyclopaedia of Russian Aircraft 1875–1995”. London, Osprey. 1995.

External links

http://www.ctrl-c.liu.se/misc/RAM/bich-11.html

1930s Soviet experimental aircraft
BICh-11